The men's K-2 1000 metres event was a pairs kayaking event conducted as part of the Canoeing at the 1984 Summer Olympics program.

Medalists

Results

Heats
17 crews entered in three heats on August 7. The top three finishers from each of the heats advanced directly to the semifinals. The remaining eight teams were relegated to the repechage heats.

Repechages
Taking place on August 7, the top three competitors in each of the two repechages advanced to the semifinals.

Semifinals
The top three finishers in each of the three semifinals (raced on August 9) advanced to the final.

Final
The final was held on August 11.

References
1984 Summer Olympics official report Volume 2, Part 2. pp. 367–8. 
Sports-reference.com 1984 K-2 1000 m results.

Men's K-2 1000
Men's events at the 1984 Summer Olympics